Repalle Municipality is the local self-government in Repalle of the Indian state of Andhra Pradesh. It is classified as a second grade municipality.

Administration 
The present municipal commissioner of the city is Vijaya Saradhi.

.

List of Municipal Chairmans

Repalle Municipal Elections

Civic works and services 

The towns residents rely on borewells, public taps for water, with the municipal department supplying 4 MLD (Million liters per day) of drinking water, 100 LPCD (litres per capita per day) of per capita water, and maintains 125 public taps, 324 public bore-wells. For public health, the municipality has 2 dispensaries and to impart primary and secondary education, it maintains 12 elementary 7 secondary schools.

See also 
 List of municipalities in Andhra Pradesh

References 

1956 establishments in Andhra Pradesh
Government agencies established in 1956
Municipalities of Andhra Pradesh
Urban local bodies in Andhra Pradesh